Super Ice Hockey is a 1994 video game based on ice hockey that released in Japan and Europe for the Super Nintendo Entertainment System. It is based on the international level of ice hockey with teams from 1994 as opposed to domestic (intra-national) ice hockey leagues.

Gameplay

General

There are several gameplay modes that can be chosen from the main menu of the game. These include exhibition mode, playoff mode, and an Olympic mode that is loosely based on the 1994 Winter Olympics. The object of the Olympic mode is to simply win the gold medal while the defeated team receives a silver medal. In order to qualify for the gold medal game, the player must rank in the top four in either "League A" or "League B" during the round-robin format; an X refers to a win while an O refers to a defeat. Achieving this will promote the player's team to a playoff of eight teams that will determine the gold and silver medal recipients. Teams that belong to opposite leagues eventually play against each other in the playoff mode.

Periods can either last for one minute, two minutes or three minutes long. Referees can be set to either real (similar to real international hockey), normal (similar to the NHL), or free (involving a visually challenged referee who only calls for icing). In the real mode, penalties are given for every body check while most body checking is allowed in normal. However, both participants that are involved in a fight are penalized in both normal and real mode. This is offset by using extremely short durations in the penalty box due to the unrealistically low period durations.

References

External links
 The History of Hockey Games Part 2

1994 video games
Ice hockey video games
Sunsoft games
Super Nintendo Entertainment System games
Super Nintendo Entertainment System-only games
Video games developed in Japan
Video games scored by Hayato Matsuo
Video games set in 1994
Yonezawa PR21 games
Multiplayer and single-player video games